Râu Sadului is a commune in Sibiu County, Transylvania, Romania, at the foothills of the Cindrel Mountains,  south of the county capital Sibiu, in the Mărginimea Sibiului ethnographical area. It is composed of a single village, Râu Sadului. At the 2011 census, 100% of inhabitants were ethnic Romanians.

References

Communes in Sibiu County
Localities in Transylvania